Keys is an unincorporated community and census-designated place (CDP) in Cherokee County, Oklahoma, United States. The population was 565 at the 2010 census.

Geography
Keys is located south of the center of Cherokee County at  (35.805324, -94.946071). It is bordered by Park Hill to the north and Pettit to the south. The eastern end of the CDP is bordered by the Illinois River at the northern end of Tenkiller Ferry Lake.

Oklahoma State Highway 82 forms the western and southern edges of the Keys CDP; it leads north  to Tahlequah, the Cherokee County seat, and southeast  to Cherokee Landing State Park on Tenkiller Ferry Lake.

School
Keys has recently acquired a high school. Its mascot is a cougar, and the school colors are red and white.

Demographics

At the 2010 census, there were 565 people, 189 households and 160 families residing in the CDP. The population density was 102.7 per square mile (40.4/km2). There were 221 housing units at an average density of 40.2/sq mi (15.8/km2). The racial makeup of the CDP was 47.8% White, 0.5% African American, 37.2% Native American, 2.3% from other races, and 12.2% from two or more races. Hispanic or Latino of any race were 4.2% of the population.

There were 189 households, of which 39.7% had children under the age of 18 living with them, 65.6% were married couples living together, 13.2% had a female householder with no husband present, and 15.3% were non-families. 12.2% of all households were made up of individuals, and 4.8% had someone living alone who was 65 years of age or older. The average household size was 2.99 and the average family size was 3.26.

29.7% of the population were under the age of 18, 9.0% from 18 to 24, 25.8% from 25 to 44, 22.3% from 45 to 64, and 13.1% who were 65 years of age or older. The median age was 35.1 years. For every 100 females, there were 85.2 males. For every 100 females age 18 and over, there were 93.7 males.

References

Census-designated places in Cherokee County, Oklahoma
Census-designated places in Oklahoma